Emma Kate Lahana (born ) is a New Zealand actress. She is known for her roles as Kira Ford, the Yellow Dino Ranger, in Power Rangers Dino Thunder, Jennifer Mason on Haven, and Brigid O'Reilly in Cloak & Dagger.

Career
Lahana played Erin Kingston, a supporting role on the New Zealand TV drama Shortland Street, and also appeared on Street Legal. She also portrayed Fiona in Disney's You Wish! In 2004, Lahana starred as Kira Ford, the Yellow Power Ranger, on Power Rangers Dino Thunder. For this series, she recorded the songs "Patiently", "Freak You Out", "I'm Over You", "Just a Little" and "True Love" (Ft. Morgan Fairhead). Lahana began her music career after joining BMI in 2005, though she later quit the industry.

Lahana appeared in an episode of the fourth season of Stargate Atlantis, "Outcast" and as the waitress abducted by a serial killer on the third-season episode of Psych. Lahana also appeared in the movies Alien Agent, and in the true-crime thriller Dear Mr. Gacy, where she played the girlfriend of Jason Moss. In 2010, she played the role of Beth in the television miniseries Seven Deadly Sins. Lahana also played a recurring character on the TV series Hellcats, starring Aly Michalka and Ashley Tisdale. She also appeared in the music video for Drew Seeley's single "How a Heart Breaks". In 2012, she appeared in the television movie Big Time Movie. In 2013, Lahana was cast in the recurring role of Jennifer Mason on the Syfy drama series, Haven.

In 2018, Lahana was cast as a series regular in the Freeform television series Marvel's Cloak & Dagger, where she played New Orleans police detective Brigid O'Reilly for two seasons from 2018 to 2019.

Personal life 
Lahana is Jewish and vegan.

Filmography

Film

Television

References

External links
 
 Dear Mr. Gacy official website

1984 births
Living people
New Zealand film actresses
New Zealand television actresses
L
People from Auckland
20th-century New Zealand actresses
21st-century New Zealand actresses
New Zealand child actresses
New Zealand soap opera actresses